Cloaca is an anatomical feature of some animals. It may also refer to:
 Cloaca (embryology), a structure in mammalian development
 Cloaca (genus), a synonym for Enterobacter, a bacterial genus
 Persistent cloaca, a congenital disorder in humans

In buildings and structures
 Cloaca (Capri), ancient sewage system
 Cloaca Maxima, part of the sewage system in ancient Rome

In arts and entertainment
 Cloaca (art), an artwork by Wim Delvoye

 Cloaca (film), a 2003 Dutch film directed by Willem van de Sande Bakhuyzen
 Cloaca Maxima (album), by Finnish rock group CMX